RecordTV Itapoan (channel 5) is a Brazilian broadcast television station in Salvador, Bahia. It was created on November 19, 1960. It belongs to RecordTV and minority interests.

TV Itapoan's Programs

 Balanço Geral BA Manhã (morning news)
Balanço Geral BA (night news)
 Bahia no Ar (morning news)
 Cidade Alerta BA (late afternoon news)
 Bom D+ verão (variety show, only during summer months)

RecordTV affiliates
Television channels and stations established in 1960
Companies based in Salvador, Bahia
1960 establishments in Brazil